Lautaro Emanuel Blanco (born 19 February 1999) is an Argentine professional footballer who plays as a left-back for La Liga club Elche CF and the Argentina national team.

Club career

Rosario Central
Blanco started out with local team La Consolata, before joining the Rosario Central academy. He signed his first professional contract at the beginning of July 2020. Blanco made the breakthrough into first-team football later that year under manager Kily González, with the defender's senior debut arriving on 2 November in the Copa de la Liga Profesional against Godoy Cruz; he played, at left-back, the full duration of a 2–1 win.

Elche
On 8 August 2022, Spanish La Liga side Elche CF reached an agreement with Rosario Central for the transfer of Blanco, with the player joining his new club in the following January.

International career 
In March 2023, Blanco received his first call-up to the Argentina senior national team by head coach Lionel Scaloni for two friendly matches against Panama and Curaçao.

Personal life
Blanco's father, Sergio, died in September 2020 after contracting COVID-19 at his workplace.

Career statistics

Notes

References

External links

1999 births
Living people
Footballers from Rosario, Santa Fe
Argentine footballers
Association football defenders
Rosario Central footballers
Elche CF players
Argentine expatriate footballers
Argentine expatriate sportspeople in Spain
Expatriate footballers in Spain